Constantine of Hessen-Rotenburg (May 24, 1716 in Rotenburg – December 30, 1778 in Schloss Wildeck) was Landgrave of Hesse-Rotenburg from 1749 until his death.

Early life 
Constantine was the son of Landgrave Ernest Leopold, Landgrave of Hesse-Rotenburg and his wife, Princess Eleonore of Löwenstein-Wertheim-Rochefort.

Personal life 
Constantine married in 1745 with Countess Marie Sophia Theresia Hedwigis Eva von Starhemberg (1722-1773), sister of Georg Adam, Prince of Starhemberg and widow of William Hyacinth, Prince of Nassau-Siegen. 

He had 8 children from his first marriage, including :
 Charles Emmanuel (1746–1812), his successor.

 Clementina (1747–1801), Married Count Palatine Theodore Eustace of Sulzbach.
 Hedwig (1748–1801), married Jacques Léopold de La Tour d'Auvergne, Duke of Bouillon.
 Christian (1750–1782), canon of Cologne and Strasbourg.
 Charles Constantine (1752-1821), a supporter of the French Revolution, better known as Citoyen Hesse.
 Antonia (1753–1823), nun.
 Wilhelmina Maria (1755–1816), married George William von Strauss baron de Dorner.
 Ernst (1758–1784), married Christine Wilhelmina Henriette Sophia von Bardeleben.

When his first wife died in 1773, he remarried in 1775 with the French Countess Johanna Henriette de Bombelles (1751-1822). They had no children.

Reign 
Under Constantine, Hesse-Wanfried was in 1755 returned to Hesse-Rotenburg after the death of Christian of Hesse-Wanfried. Hesse-Rotenburg, which had been divided in 1648, was now again reunited and remained so until the Treaty of Lunéville in 1801.

He became a knight in the Order of the Golden Fleece in 1759.

References 

House of Hesse-Kassel
18th-century German people
Landgraves of Hesse-Rotenburg
Knights of the Golden Fleece
1716 births
1778 deaths